David Allen Watkins (born March 10, 1943) is an American politician and a Democratic member of the Kentucky House of Representatives representing District 11 since January 2007.

Education
Watkins earned his BS and MA from Western Kentucky University and his MD from the University of Louisville School of Medicine.

Elections
2012 Watkins and returning 2010 Republican challenger Paul DeSpain were both unopposed for their May 22, 2012 primaries, setting up a rematch; Watkins won the November 6, 2012 General election with 9,714 votes (62.0%) against DeSpain.
2006 Watkins challenged District 11 incumbent Representative Gross Lindsay in the 2006 Democratic Primary, winning with 4,765 votes (53.2%) against Representative Lindsay, and was unopposed for the November 7, 2006 General election, winning with 9,264 votes.
2008 Watkins was challenged in the 2008 Democratic Primary, winning with 5,302 votes (60.4%) and was unopposed for the November 4, 2008 General election, winning with 13,935 votes.
2010 Watkins was unopposed for the May 18, 2010 Democratic Primary and won the November 2, 2010 General election with 7,078 votes (60.6%) against Republican nominee Paul DeSpain.

Committee leadership positions
David Watkins has served in the following committee leadership roles in the Kentucky House of Representatives: Medicaid Oversight and Advisory Committee (co-chair); Tourism Development and Energy (vice-chair), Appropriations and Revenue - Human Resources (vice chair), and  Health and Welfare (vice chair). He has been a member of the committees on Economic Development and Tourism, Appropriations and Revenue, Education, Education - Postsecondary Education, and Transportation.

References

External links
Official page at the Kentucky General Assembly

David Watkins at Ballotpedia
David Allen Watkins at OpenSecrets

Place of birth missing (living people)
1943 births
Living people
Democratic Party members of the Kentucky House of Representatives
People from Henderson, Kentucky
Physicians from Kentucky
University of Louisville School of Medicine alumni
Western Kentucky University alumni
21st-century American politicians